California Miramar University (CMU) is a private for-profit university in San Diego, California.  The university offers degree programs through distance education and a combination of on-line and classroom (hybrid) delivery. It is accredited by the Distance Education Accrediting Commission.

History 
The California Post-Secondary Education Commission and California Miramar University list CMU date of establishment as 2005. According to California Miramar University's website, CMU purchased the assets of Pacific Western University, including its State of California approval status, in late 2005. As part of the asset sale, an institutions transition plan was implemented that called for PWU (California) to relocate to San Diego and teach out all active students over 18 months.

In early 2007, the conditions of the asset transition were complete and the California State Approval was officially transferred to CMU.  At that time Pacific Western University (California) ceased operations.  Later that year California Miramar University filed for accreditation.  As part of the accreditation process the accrediting agency ruled that CMU and PWU California were separate schools that operated under separate academic standards.  The accreditation agencies stipulated that graduates of Pacific Western University - California would not be eligible to receive CMU diplomas or transcripts and that the records of the two schools should be held separate. To comply with accreditation requirements, CMU transferred copies of all PWU – California institutional and student records to Education Services, which now serves as the official custodian of records for all PWU students.

Academics 
California Miramar University offers the degree programs at the undergraduate level degrees in business administration. The associate-level program in business includes two separate majors and the bachelor-level program in business administration includes five separate majors. The graduate level degrees include six separate majors in the Master of Business Administration degree program, Master of Science degree programs in Strategic Leadership, Master of Science in Computer Information Systems and four separate majors in the Doctor of Business Administration degree program.

Accreditation and approvals
The university is accredited by the Accrediting Council for Independent Colleges and Schools (ACICS), and the Distance Education Accrediting Commission. It is also approved under the California Private Postsecondary Education Act of 2009, section 94890 by the California Bureau of Private Postsecondary Education (BPPE).

See also 
 List of colleges and universities in California

References

External links
 

Distance education institutions based in the United States
Universities and colleges in San Diego
Distance Education Accreditation Commission
Unaccredited institutions of higher learning in California
 
Educational institutions established in 1977
Colleges accredited by the Accrediting Council for Independent Colleges and Schools
1977 establishments in California
Private universities and colleges in California